Sir Clive Hubert Lloyd  (born 31 August 1944) is a Guyanese-British former cricketer and captain of the West Indies cricket team. Lloyd is widely regarded as one of the  greatest captains of all time along with Steve Waugh and Graeme Smith. As a boy he went to Chatham High School in Georgetown. At the age of 14 he was captain of his school cricket team in the Chin Cup inter-school competition. One of his childhood memories is of sitting in a tree outside the ground overlooking the sightscreen watching Garry Sobers score two centuries for West Indies v Pakistan.

In 1971 he was named a Wisden Cricketer of the Year. He captained the West Indies between 1974 and 1985 and oversaw their rise to become the greatest Test and One Day International team of the 20th century, only Australia achieved a similar success under the captaincy of Steve Waugh and Ricky Ponting later. He is one of the most successful Test captains of all time: during his captaincy the side had a run of 27 matches without defeat, which included 11 wins in succession (Viv Richards acted as captain for one of the 27 matches, against Australia at Port of Spain in 1983–84). He was the first West Indian player to earn 100 international caps. Lloyd captained the West Indies in three World Cups, winning in 1975 (with Lloyd scoring a century) and 1979 while losing the 1983 final to India.

Lloyd was a tall, powerful middle-order batsman and occasional medium-pace bowler. In his youth he was also a strong cover point fielder. He wore his famous glasses as a result of being poked in the eye with a ruler. His Test match debut came in 1966. Lloyd scored 7,515 runs at Test level, at an average of 46.67. He hit 70 sixes in his Test career, which is the 14th highest number of any player. He played for his home nation of Guyana in West Indies domestic cricket, and for Lancashire (he was made captain in 1981) in England. He is a cousin of spin bowler Lance Gibbs. Since retiring as a player, Lloyd has remained heavily involved in cricket, managing the West Indies in the late 1990s, and coaching and commentating. He was an ICC match referee from 2001 to 2006.

In 2009, Lloyd was inducted into the ICC Cricket Hall of Fame. He was knighted in the 2020 New Year Honours for services to cricket.

Career

Lloyd made his Test debut on 13 December, 1966 against India. He scored 82 in the first innings and 78 not out in the second. 

In 1971–72, Lloyd suffered a back injury while playing for a Rest of the World team at the Adelaide Oval. He was fielding in the covers when Ashley Mallett hit a lofted drive towards his area. He made an effort to take the catch but it bounced out of his hands when he hit the ground awkwardly. When he went to get up, he felt a stabbing pain in his back and he was unable to move. He spent the next few weeks in an Adelaide hospital flat on his back.

In the 1975 Cricket World Cup Final against Australia, the West Indies were deep in trouble at 3/50 when Lloyd strode to the crease. He duly made 102 from 85 balls, the only limited overs international century of his career. With Rohan Kanhai he added 149 for the West Indies to win by 17 runs. Play ended at 8:40pm and was the longest day's play ever at Lord's.

On 22 January 1985, Lloyd was made an honorary Officer of the Order of Australia for his services to the sport of cricket, particularly in relation to his outstanding and positive influence on the game in Australia.

In 2005, Lloyd offered his patronage to Major League Cricket for their inaugural Interstate Cricket Cup in the United States, to be named the Sir Clive Lloyd Cup. His son, Jason Clive Lloyd, is a goalkeeper for the Guyana national football team. In 2007, Lloyd's authorised biography, Supercat, was published. It was written by the cricket journalist Simon Lister.

In 2022, Lloyd received a knighthood at an investiture ceremony at Windsor Castle.

Clive is regarded as one of the greatest captains in the history of the game.

Personal life

Lloyd is a fan of English football club Everton FC.

References

1944 births
Living people
Sportspeople from Georgetown, Guyana
Cricketers at the 1975 Cricket World Cup
Cricketers at the 1979 Cricket World Cup
Cricketers at the 1983 Cricket World Cup
Guyanese cricketers
Lancashire cricket captains
Lancashire cricketers
West Indies One Day International cricketers
West Indies Test cricketers
West Indian cricketers of 1970–71 to 1999–2000
West Indian cricketers of 1945–46 to 1969–70
West Indies Test cricket captains
World Series Cricket players
International Cavaliers cricketers
Cricket match referees
Honorary Officers of the Order of Australia
Recipients of the Chaconia Medal
Wisden Leading Cricketers in the World
Afro-Guyanese people
Guyana cricketers
Cricket players and officials awarded knighthoods
Naturalised citizens of the United Kingdom